Samo Petrevski-Seton (born 19 February 1998) is a professional Australian rules footballer playing for the West Coast Eagles in the Australian Football League (AFL).

Early life and career
Petrevski-Seton spent his first years on a cattle station near Fitzroy Crossing, Western Australia, where his father was working as a stockman. The family moved to Halls Creek when he was three. Petrevski-Seton is Indigenous Australian, and also has Macedonian ancestry on his mother's side – his maternal grandfather immigrated from Macedonia. He grew up speaking Kriol as his first language, and did not learn standard English until moving to Perth to board at Clontarf Aboriginal College, which he attended from 2013 to 2015. Outside of playing football, Petrevski-Seton enjoyed competitive bull riding, which he took up at the age of 12.

Football career

Junior career
Petrevski-Seton grew up playing for Halls Creek teams in the junior divisions of the East Kimberley Football Association. After moving to Perth for school, he began training with the Claremont Football Club, whose recruiting zone takes in the Kimberley region. Petrevski-Seton spent four seasons of WAFL colts (under-18) competition, making his debut at the age of 15. He made his senior debut for Claremont at the age of 17, playing three games early in the 2015 season. Petrevski-Seton also represented Western Australia at under-16 and under-18 level. He was named in the All-Australian team at the 2015 AFL Under 18 Championships.

AFL career
Petrevski-Seton was drafted by Carlton with their first pick (sixth overall) in the 2016 national draft. After his team's 23-point win against  at the MCG in round seven, in which he recorded 21 disposals, four marks, three tackles and two goals, he was nominated for the 2017 AFL Rising Star.

In his second season, Petreveski-Seton played all 22 games in 2018. He averaged 16.1 disposals, and kicked 5 goals for the year. He also averaged 4.3 tackles per match.

In 2019, Petreveski-Seton had a break out game against the Western Bulldogs in round 5. Amassing 35 disposals, 9 more than his previous best, as well as kicking an important steadying goal in the 3rd quarter, he was considered by many experts to be best on ground in Carlton's first win of the 2019 season.

He was traded on 7 October.

Statistics
Statistics are correct to the end of round 1, 2020

|- style="background:#EAEAEA"
| scope="row" text-align:center | 2017
| 
| 5 || 20 || 10 || 7 || 168 || 112 || 280 || 65 || 95 || 0.5 || 0.4 ||8.4 || 5.6 || 14.0 || 3.3 || 4.8 || 3 
|-
| scope="row" text-align:center | 2018
|  
| 5 || 22 || 5 || 8 || 206 || 148 || 354 || 79 || 95 || 0.2 || 0.4 || 9.4 || 6.7 || 16.1 || 3.6 || 4.3 || 1 
|- style="background:#EAEAEA"
| scope="row" text-align:center | 2019
| 
| 5 || 22 || 4 || 4 || 245 || 175 || 420 || 87 || 96 || 0.2 || 0.2 || 11.1 || 8.0 || 19.1 || 4.0 || 4.4 || 2 
|-
| scope="row" text-align:center | 2020
|  
| 5 || 1 || 0 || 0 || 11 || 8 || 19 || 0 || 2 || 0.0 || 0.0 || 11.0 || 8.0 || 19.0 || 0.0 || 2.0 ||  
|- style="background:#EAEAEA; font-weight:bold; width:2em"
| scope="row" text-align:center class="sortbottom" colspan=3 | Career
| 65
| 19
| 19
| 630
| 443
| 1073
| 231
| 288
| 0.3
| 0.3
| 9.7
| 6.8
| 16.5
| 3.6
| 4.4
| 6
|}

References

External links

1998 births
Living people
Australian people of Macedonian descent
Australian rules footballers from Western Australia
Carlton Football Club players
Claremont Football Club players
Indigenous Australian players of Australian rules football
People from Halls Creek, Western Australia
West Coast Eagles players